Norton Green is a hamlet on the Isle of Wight. It is located just north of Freshwater (where the 2011 Census was included) in the west of the island.

External links
 

Villages on the Isle of Wight